DLF land grab case is a case related to 50 acre land grab in 2013 in Amipur village of Haryana during the Congress' Bhupinder Singh Hooda government, for which Robert Vadra, Hooda and DLF are being investigated by the CBI (c. December 2017). Hooda's generosity towards land sharks and builders caused huge losses to farmers and Haryana Government. Consequently, there are Central Bureau of Investigation (CBI) inquiries and court cases against him related to shady land deals. Those deals include the allotment of a highly subsidised land and change in land use license for his relatives and influential friends connected to Indian National Congress, such Sonia Gandhi's son-in-law Robert Vadra. Jitesh Vadra made illegal gains of over INR50 crore from this land deal within few months in 2008. CBI has filed an 80,000 page long chargesheet in the court related to this case and Manesar land scam case.

There are a total of 6 CBI cases and several other vigilance department investigations against Hooda underway. Central Bureau of Investigation is investigating several scams, mostly related to illegal land grab, that took place during his rule in Haryana. These investigations include the Manesar land scam, Gurugram Rajiv Gandhi Trust land grab scam, Sonepat-Kharkhoda IMT land scam case, Garhi Sampla Uddar Gagan land scam, AJL-National Herald Panchkula land grab case, AJL-National Herald Panchkula land grab scam, Haryana Forestry scam case and Haryana Raxil drug purchase scam. He has been already chargesheeted in the Manesar-Gurugram land scam, while other cases are still under investigation (c. March 2018). Hooda was acquiring land from poor, illiterate farmers at a low rate in the name of "public interest" only to later license this to builders after granting out-of-turn favors that helped the land value increase exponentially. During his 10-year rule as Chief Minister, Hooda, licensed a massive 24,825 acres of land compared to just 8,550.32 acres by successive Chief Ministers in the 23 years preceding Hooda rule.

Details

Modus of scam
Builders coerce farmers to sell their land by getting the government to use the Section 4 of the land law to have a government notification issued to the farmer that their land is required for the "public purpose". Builders try to acquire this land by offering a small premium above the government's rate for the acquisition of the land. If landowners farmers still resist the sale, then Section 6 of land law is applied by declaring the government's intention to acquire land, which forces the reluctant farmers to sell the land to builders at small premium. Once the land is acquired by the builders, government cancels the acquisition process and releases the land to new build owners, along with the change in land use permission to build residential and industrial building on the farm land. This results in steep rise in the land prices, resulting in massive gains for the builders, opportunity cost loss to the farmers and land tax revenue loss to the government. Robert Vadra and DLF were the beneficiary builders in Hooda's regime.

Vadra made an illegal profit of more than INR50 crore after buying 3 acre land for INR 7 crore and by onselling it to DLF for INR 58 crore after a few months after Hooda's Indian National Congress government had granted a Change in Land Use license to convert its usage from agriculture to commercial. vadra has bought properties using unsecured loans from DLF. After Bharatiya Janata Party (BJP) government came to power in Haryana, the "Justice Dhingra Commission" was formed in 2015 to investigate the scam. Dhingra Commission indicted Hooda. Dhingra Commission's report states that there was collusion aimed at benefiting Vadra's company Skylight Hospitality, and it sought further inquiry. Consequently, the case was handed over to CBI for the further investigation.

Current status: CBI inquiry
Case is currently under investigation by the CBI, who has filed 80,000 pages long chargesheet in the court.

See also
 Corruption in India
 National Herald scam
 Rajiv Gandhi Charitable Trust land grab cases
 Robert Vadra land grab cases
 List of scams in India

References

High Courts of India cases
21st-century scandals
Cover-ups
Criminal investigation
Corruption in India
Lawsuits
Trials in India
Corruption in Haryana
Supreme Court of India cases
Political corruption in India
Indian National Congress of Haryana